Karibib railway station is a railway station serving the town of Karibib in Namibia. It is part of the TransNamib Railway.

Karibib is situated on the Windhoek—Swakopmund line, built in 1902 during Imperial Germany's colonial rule of German South West Africa. In 1914 this line was extended to Walvis Bay.

See also
 Rail transport in Namibia

References

Railway stations in Namibia
TransNamib Railway
1902 establishments in German South West Africa
Railway stations opened in 1902